South Africa and the Barbarians have played each other on eight occasions. The first encounter was in January 1952 and saw South Africa win 17–3 at the Cardiff Arms Park. More recently, the two teams have played in a "Final Challenge" match in the end-of-year rugby union tests, which is often played at Twickenham.

Overall summary

Matches

References

Barbarian F.C. matches
South Africa national rugby union team matches